Zadvydas v. Davis, 533 U.S. 678 (2001), was a case decided by the Supreme Court of the United States. The court ruled that the plenary power doctrine does not authorize the indefinite detention of immigrants under order of deportation whom no other country will accept. To justify detention of immigrants for a period longer than six months, the government was required to show removal in the foreseeable future or special circumstances.

Background

Fifth Circuit case
Kestutis Zadvydas was a resident alien in the United States who was ordered deported in 1994 based on his criminal record. Zadvydas was born of Lithuanian parents while in Germany, but was not a citizen of either country, and neither would accept him.  Under federal law, once a person has been ordered to be deported, the U.S. Attorney General is required to detain them and complete the deportation within 90 days. However, the Attorney General claimed that if the 90-day period passed by without completing the desired deportation, the detention period could be continued indefinitely until the person could be deported.

In September 1995 after Lithuania and Germany had refused to accept Zadvydas, he filed a petition for a writ of habeas corpus in U.S. District Court. In 1996 the Immigration and Naturalization Service (INS) unsuccessfully requested that the Dominican Republic accept Zadvydas based on his wife's Dominican citizenship. In October 1997 the District Court granted the writ and ordered him released under supervision.  The government appealed and the Fifth Circuit Court of Appeals overturned the district court.

Ninth Circuit case
Kim Ho Ma was a Cambodian, also a resident alien in the United States.  At age 17, Kim was convicted of manslaughter and was ordered deported.  Cambodia did not have a treaty with the United States and would not accept Kim. In 1999, Kim filed a petition for a writ of habeas corpus in U.S. District Court. A five-judge panel of that court considered Kim's case in connection with about 100 other cases and ordered him released. The government appealed and the Ninth Circuit Court of Appeals upheld the district court.

Appeals
Zadvydas in the Fifth Circuit case and the government in the Kim case both appealed to the Supreme Court. As both circuit courts had come to opposing positions, there was a split in the circuits which may only be resolved by a Supreme Court ruling. The court granted certiorari in both cases and consolidated the cases for the hearing.

Opinions of the court

Arguments
Robert F. Barnard argued the case for Zadvydas. Jay W. Stansell argued the case for Kim.  Representing the United States was Deputy Solicitor General Edwin Kneedler. Amicus curiae briefs were filed by the Washington Legal Foundation on behalf of the government in the Zadvydas case and by the Legal Immigration Network, Inc., the American Association of Jews from the former USSR, the Lawyers Committee for Human Rights, the American Civil Liberties Union, Human Rights Watch, and Carolyn Patty Blum, et al., on behalf of Kim.

Majority opinion

Justice Stephen Breyer delivered the opinion of the court. He noted that the statute grants the Attorney General the authority to detain a deportee past the term of the 90-day removal period, without judicial or administrative review. Breyer indicated that an indefinite, potentially permanent detention was unconstitutional. Using the principles of statutory construction, Breyer stated that the court must infer that the law limits such a detention to that period that is necessary to accomplish the removal of the alien from the United States. Since the detention was for the purpose of removing the alien from the country, once the alien cannot be removed, the immigration purpose for the detention no longer exists. Without a limitation on detentions, the court would be forced to declare the law unconstitutional. He noted that allowing an administrative agency to conduct an unreviewable hearing on such a fundamental right had already been ruled against by the court.

The government also argued that Congress had plenary power to enact such a law under its authority to control immigration, and that both the executive and judicial branches must defer to that decisionmaking.  Breyer noted that while Congress may use that power, they "must choose 'a constitutionally permissive means of implementing' that power" and the interpretation that the government advocates is not such a permissive means. The court ruled that a hearing must be held after a six-month detention. Substantive due process applied to aliens that resided within the United States, and absent a showing that they were a danger to society or a flight risk, they could not be detained.

Dissenting opinions
Justice Antonin Scalia dissented from the majority.  Scalia stated that an alien who has no legal right to be in the United States has no right to release into the country that is trying to expel him or her. Scalia quoted Justice Robert H. Jackson in his dissent, in asserting that "Due process does not invest any alien with a right to enter the United States, nor confer on those admitted the right to remain against the national will." [italics in original]

Justice Anthony Kennedy also dissented. Kennedy said that the majority disregarded congressional intent and then rewrote the statute. He posited that Congress gave the Attorney General the express authority to order continued detention, and added that the majority misapplied the concept of statutory construction, noting that the court could only distinguish between plausible interpretations. If there were two or more interpretations, then the court is bound to accept the one that does not create a constitutional issue, but Kennedy states that this was never the situation in this case.

Subsequent developments

Impact
According to the U.S. Inspector General, nearly 134,000 immigrants with final orders of removal were released into the general population in the U.S. from 2001 to 2004, as a result of the Zadvydas ruling. According to Immigration and Customs Enforcement, nearly 4000 immigrants with criminal records have been released into the general population in the U.S. each year since 2008.

According to a number of legal experts, INS has taken the view that it can detain aliens for preventive rather than punitive purposes. These experts state INS has no authority to conduct a punitive detention, which is only authorized by criminal statutes. Civil libertarians have noted that over 2,000 aliens have been held indefinitely without hope of repatriation and that the Department of Homeland Security holds approximately 31,000 immigrants in detention at any given time.

It has been noted that 20 years prior to the Zadvydas decision, approximately 122,000 Mariel Cubans had been paroled into the United States after facing indefinite detention. Most of these were inadmissible to the United States due to their criminal convictions in Cuba and in the U.S., but were not deportable as Cuba refused to accept them back. Once paroled, they remained ineligible for lawful permanent residency in the United States. In one case, a resident alien with a 20-year-old battery conviction was detained for more than four years before being released.

Opponents of the Zadvydas decision note that suspects in two murder cases in 2012 had been allowed to stay in the U.S. despite final deportation orders. In January 2012, the Miami Herald revealed that Kesler Dufrene, accused of murdering three people in Miami, was released from federal detention despite a final deportation order to Haiti because the U.S. suspended deportations to that country for several months after the 2010 Haiti earthquake. This case also allowed deportee Binh Thai Luc to be released from immigration detention after his native Vietnam declined to offer the U.S. government travel documents. Luc was arrested in March 2012 for the murder of five people in San Francisco.

Zadvydas was also cited by the 9th Circuit three-judge appeals panel on February 9, 2017, in Washington v. Trump, with regard to an executive order concerning the restriction of immigration from certain stipulated countries. In that case, the 9th Circuit panel referred to the Zadvydas opinion "emphasizing that the power of the political branches over immigration 'is subject to important constitutional limitations'."

Following the 2002 signing of a repatriation agreement between Cambodia and the United States, Kim Ho Ma was deported. As of 2007, he lived in a rural area of Cambodia with his wife.

Supreme Court case 

Zadvydas was cited in a subsequent Supreme Court case, Clark v. Martinez, that reiterated the principle that all people within the United States were entitled to due process and could not be deprived of liberty indefinitely.  Justice Scalia, despite his dissent in Zadvydas, authored the 7–2 decision in Clark.  The government had argued that the law allowed the government to detain people up to the point that the detention "approached constitutional limits."  Scalia noted that "If we were, as the Government seems to believe, free to 'interpret' statutes as becoming inoperative when they 'approach constitutional limits,' we would be able to spare ourselves the necessity of ever finding a statute unconstitutional as applied."

Legislative remedies 
In an effort to roll back Zadvydas, Rep. Lamar Smith (R-Texas) has introduced the "Keep Our Communities Safe Act" (H.R. 1932), legislation aimed at allowing indefinite detention of unremovable admitted immigrants and asylum applicants (immigrants awaiting approval of asylum applications). Three experts lent support to the legislation during a hearing on the Act: Gary Mead, Executive Associate Director for ICE's Enforcement and Removal Operations; Thomas H. Dupree, Jr., partner at Gibson, Dunn & Crutcher LLP (and former Principal Deputy Assistant Attorney General under President Bush); and Ft. Myers Chief of Police Douglas Baker, a colleague of Officer Widman who was murdered by an alien released as a result of Zadvydas.

Conversely, the American Immigration Lawyers Association (AILA) have denounced the legislation, stating that: "The bill, H.R. 1932, would strip important due process protections of harmless individuals by needlessly increasing the government's already broad authority to detain noncitizens."  David Leopold, a past AILA President, explains: "The deprivation of liberty is a powerful tool that must be exercised carefully. DHS has exceptional latitude to detain noncitizens who are a flight risk or pose a danger to our communities. Those powers do not need further expansion." In 2010, the Department of Homeland Security detained nearly 400,000 immigrants at a cost of $2 billion. If H.R.1932 passes, this cost could increase exponentially. The constitutionality of the bill has been questioned. Joanne Lin, legislative counsel for the American Civil Liberties Union (ACLU), stated that the bill would authorize indefinite detention of immigrants without providing procedural safeguards.

See also
List of United States Supreme Court cases, volume 533

References

External links
 

United States Supreme Court cases
2001 in United States case law
United States immigration and naturalization case law
Lithuania–United States relations
Germany–United States relations
Cambodia–United States relations
United States Supreme Court cases of the Rehnquist Court